Samec (feminine Samcová) is a Czech surname. Notable people with the surname include:

 Alois Samec (1906–?), Czech wrestler
 Petr Samec (born 1964), Czech footballer

Czech-language surnames